NiL Éditions is a French publishing house founded in 1993. The name of this company comes from the contraction of the name of its founder, Nicole Lattès. It is part of the groupe Robert Laffont.

The house publishes both political and societal essays as well as French and foreign literature.

External links 
 Official website
 Éditeur : NiL éditions on Librairie Eyrolles.com

Book publishing companies of France
French brands
Companies established in 1993
Editis